Gamelia is a genus of moths in the family Saturniidae first described by Jacob Hübner in 1819.

Species
The genus includes the following species:

 Gamelia abas (Cramer, 1775)
 Gamelia abasia (Stoll, 1781)
 Gamelia abasiella Lemaire, 1973
 Gamelia anableps (R. Felder & Rogenhofer, 1874)
 Gamelia berliozi Lemaire, 1967
 Gamelia catharina (Draudt, 1929)
 Gamelia cimarrones Decaens, Bonilla & Ramirez, 2005
 Gamelia dargei Naumann, Brosch & Wenczel, 2005
 Gamelia denhezi Lemaire, 1967
 Gamelia kiefferi Lemaire, 1967
 Gamelia lichyi Lemaire, 1973
 Gamelia longispina Naumann, Brosch & Wenczel, 2005
 Gamelia musta Schaus, 1912
 Gamelia neidhoeferi Lemaire, 1967
 Gamelia paraensis Lemaire, 1973
 Gamelia pygmaea (Schaus, 1904)
 Gamelia pyrrhomelas (Walker, 1855)
 Gamelia remissa (Weymer, 1907)
 Gamelia remissoides Lemaire, 1967
 Gamelia rindgei Lemaire, 1967
 Gamelia rubriluna (Walker, 1862)
 Gamelia septentrionalis Bouvier, 1936
 Gamelia vanschaycki Naumann, Brosch & Wenczel, 2005
 Gamelia viettei Lemaire, 1967

References

Hemileucinae